Manual of Painting and Calligraphy (Portuguese: Manual de Pintura e Caligrafia) is a novel by Nobel Prize-winning author José Saramago. It was first published in 1977. An English translation by Giovanni Pontiero was published in 1993. The plot of the novel involves H., who paints the industrialist S. and has an affair with his secretary.

References

Novels by José Saramago
1977 novels
20th-century Portuguese novels
Portuguese-language novels